Zeynep Bastık (born 8 July 1993) is a Turkish singer, songwriter, dancer, and actress.

Life 
Her grandmother is of Albanian origin. Her family members are also musicians. Her mother was a folk dance teacher. At the age of fifteen she joined the Fire of Anatolia as a dancer and remained part of the group for eight years. She later became interested in Latin dance and pole dance. She also worked as actress in musical theatres. In 2010, she started professional music with the band "Jackpot" in İzmir, performing mainly cover songs. Until 2012, she performed with this group on stage in different cities, including İzmir, Eskişehir and Bursa.

Her backing vocals were featured in Murat Dalkılıç's song "Lüzumsuz Savaş" and Anıl Piyancı's song "Delili Yok". She worked as Dalkılıç's backing vocalist for three years. With Dalkılıç's help, she released her first single "Fırça" in 2014 and second single "Şahaneyim" in 2017. She performed the duet "Ben Kalp Sen", which was composed by Dalkılıç for the series Aşk Yeniden. She also had minor roles in various TV series such as Adı Mutluluk, Yasak Elma, Sil Baştan, Umuda Kelepçe Vurulmaz and Yuvamdaki Düşman.

On the EP Akustikler, she collaborated with composers Emir Can İğrek, Sezen Aksu and Oğuzhan Koç. She wrote the lyrics for her song "Çukur" and composed it together with Çağrı Telkıvıran. All songs of Akustikler are acoustic versions.

Together with Serhat Şensesli, she wrote and composed the song "Kendi Yolumuzda" as a collaboration with Elidor to mark the International Women's Day. She co-wrote and co-composed some of the songs in her album Zeynodisco.

Bastık became an advertising face for Adidas in 2019, Elidor and Penti in 2020, Getir in 2021, and Vodafone in 2022.

Music style 
Bastık mainly performed rock and later acoustic and electronic music. She started her solo music career shortly afterwards. She became famous after releasing a cover version of Ezhel's song "Felaket". Additionally, she covered a number of other songs, notably by Fikri Karayel, Harun Kolçak and Ümit Sayın, which she shared on her YouTube channel. These covers helped with increasing her fame. According to Tolga Akyıldız, performing the songs of artists such as Aylin Aslım, İzel, Ferda Anıl Yarkın, Kenan Doğulu, Levent Yüksel, Jabbar, Tarkan, Mustafa Sandal, Şebnem Ferah, Harun Kolçak, Ajda Pekkan, Nilüfer, Kerim Tekin, Şahsenem, Pinhani and Sezen Aksu, and her duets with multiple artists have contributed to her popularity in the digital music market. Bastık was able to come to the fore with these advantages. It has been suggested that Can Ozan, who made his debut in the same time as Bastık, became more popular and known after his duet with her was released.

Discography

Non-album singles

As featured artist

Filmography

Commercials
Adidas
Elidor
Penti
Getir
Vodafone

References

External links 
 
 
 Zeynep Bastık 

1993 births
Living people
Turkish lyricists
Turkish pop singers
Golden Butterfly Award winners
21st-century Turkish singers
People from Çanakkale
Turkish television actresses
21st-century Turkish women singers